This is a list of affiliates of the Three Angels Broadcasting Network, a religious television and radio network founded by Danny Shelton.

Television

Radio
Three Angels Broadcasting Network also has a network of affiliated radio stations. Not all affiliated stations are full time 3ABN affiliates, and some also carry programming from LifeTalk Radio or Radio 74 Internationale. Most affiliates are low powered.

References

External links
List of 3ABN television affiliates from 3ABN Web-Site
List of 3ABN radio affiliates from 3ABN Web-Site

 
Lists of radio stations in the United States
Lists of television channels in the United States